Glossopharyngeal ganglion is a ganglion associated with cranial nerve IX. There are two types:

 Inferior ganglion of glossopharyngeal nerve
 Superior ganglion of glossopharyngeal nerve